A Hero on Horseback is a 1927 American silent Western film directed by Del Andrews and starring Hoot Gibson. It was produced and directed by Universal Pictures.

A copy is held in the Library of Congress collection.

Plot summary 
Billy Garford borrows $500 from rancher J.D. Starbuck and proceeds to lose most of it gambling.  With $50 left, Billy stakes old prospector Jimmie Breeze.

Now broke, Billy hires himself out to Starbuck.  Billy falls in love with Starbuck's daughter, Ollie and is fired when Starbuck discovers the affair.

Jimmie returns, having struck it rich, and together they buy a local bank.  Mason is nearly lynched when the bank's funds are stolen.

Cast

Accolades 
Dan Mason's role as prospector Jimmie Breeze was praised as one of his finest.

See also

 Hoot Gibson filmography

References

External links
 
 

1927 films
Universal Pictures films
American black-and-white films
1927 Western (genre) films
Films directed by Del Andrews
Silent American Western (genre) films
1920s American films